Gunter Jahn (27 September 1910 – 12 April 1992) was German U-boat commander during World War II. He was born in Hamburg, Germany and began his naval career in April 1931 as a Seekadett. He first served on the light cruiser Nürnberg for more than two years, including nine patrols in the first year of the war.

In March 1941 Jahn joined the U-boat force and his first patrol were on board  in September 1941. Later in November he commissioned . On his second patrol he broke through the Strait of Gibraltar and went on to become one of the most successful U-boat commanders in the Mediterranean Sea. In July 1943 he left the boat and became the commander of the 29th U-boat Flotilla. In September 1944 he fell into French captivity, where he spent nearly two years.

Awards 
 Wehrmacht Long Service Award 4th Class (2 October 1936)
 Iron Cross (1939)
 2nd Class (18 October 1939)
 1st Class (6 October 1942)
 Medaille zur Erinnerung an die Heimkerhr des Memllandes (20 December 1939)
 U-boat War Badge (1939) (6 October 1942)
 Knight's Cross of the Iron Cross on 30 April 1943 as Kapitänleutnant and commander of U-596

References

Citations

Bibliography 

 
 
 

1910 births
1992 deaths
Military personnel from Hamburg
U-boat commanders (Kriegsmarine)
Recipients of the Knight's Cross of the Iron Cross
Reichsmarine personnel
German prisoners of war in World War II held by France